Žiga is a Slovene given name, a form of Sigmund:
Žiga Jeglič (born 1988) Slovenian ice hockey player
Žiga Kariž (born 1973) Slovenian painter
Žiga Pavlin (born 1985) Slovenian ice hockey player
Žiga Hirschler (1894–1941) Croatian composer
Žiga Pance (born 1989) Slovenian ice hockey player

See also
 Ziga (disambiguation)

Slovene masculine given names